Chaetocerotophycidae is a grouping of Coscinodiscophyceae, previously known as "Centrales".

References 

SAR supergroup suborders
Coscinodiscophyceae